The 2004 Virginia Democratic presidential primary took place on February 10, 2004 as part of the 2004 United States Democratic presidential primaries. The delegate allocation is Proportional. the candidates are awarded delegates in proportion to the percentage of votes received and is open to anyone. A total of 82 (of 98) delegates are awarded proportionally. A 15 percent threshold is required to receive delegates. Frontrunner John Kerry won the primary with Senator John Edwards obtaining over 20% and receiving delegates.

Analysis 
Kerry won most of the counties and all the congressional districts in the state. His key to victory was winning Fairfax County with almost 56% of the vote. Fairfax had by far the largest turnout in the state. Edwards won several counties in the southern portion of the state, including his best performance in Wythe County, which he won with almost 58%. Clark's best performance was by far in Lynchburg City, which he obtained almost 24% of the vote. Dean's strongest performance was in Albemarle County, where he obtained almost 12% of the vote.

References

Virginia
2004 Virginia elections
2004